Turytt is a fictional character featured in comic books published by DC Comics. He first appeared in Green Lantern (vol. 4) #11 (June 2006) in part two of the story entitled "Revenge of the Green Lanterns".

Fictional character biography

History

Turytt is a very tall, well-muscled humanoid alien with red skin, a blonde ponytail down the center of his head, and protruding jagged horns on his abdomen, arms and head. Other distinguishing features include claws on each hand and superhuman strength. Turytt bears a vague resemblance to the Superman villain Doomsday. Very little is known of the past of the Green Lantern who has come to be known as Turytt. What is known, however, is that he hails from the space sector 786 and is the successor of Ke'Haan of Varva. If he comes from the same planet, it has not yet been revealed. Turytt takes his duties as Green Lantern very seriously and he has shown to have been greatly hurt by the betrayal of the Corps by Hal Jordan and especially the death of his predecessor. As a Green Lantern, his first duty was to inform Ke'Haan's family of his demise. Sharing their grief he vowed to put an end to the one who had been responsible for his death.

Rookie Green Lantern of sector 786
While Turytt is not as experienced in the use of his ring as Guy Gardner, John Stewart or Hal Jordan, he is one of the few rookies to have almost completed his training as he sports the Green Lantern emblem on his belt as opposed to an empty spot like those still in training. His reputation has also caused him to become favored by female rookie Lanterns.

He finally catches up with Ke'Haan's murderer on Oa and confronts the senior Lantern. Hal Jordan tries to reason with him but instead he introduces himself and proceeds to instigate a fight with both Jordan and Guy Gardner. Hal Jordan refuses to fight back. Guy Gardner, however, has no such problems and Turytt finds himself knocked out by a well placed punch from Gardner.

His "rookie" fans then proceed to attack the senior Lanterns despite the fact that he has not recovered. Along with the rest of the rookies, he is reprimanded by Kilowog and Salakk who give him and his 'groupies' seventy demerits for their behavior.

Hal Jordan and Guy Gardner return the Defenders of Oa and it is unknown how he will react to the return of his predecessor and the other Defenders of Oa.

Turytt is seen during the Sinestro Corps War, and during the debate over Laira's killing of Amon Sur. He also held a vigil for all the fallen Corpsmen the night after Sinestro was defeated. Turytt blames Jordan for Ke'Haan's death at the hands of the Anti-Monitor, despite the fact that there was nothing he could have done about it.

Blackest Night

A swarm of black power rings descend on Oa, transforming all the fallen Lanterns in the planet's crypt into Black Lanterns, who promptly attack the living Lanterns. Turytt is one of many Green Lanterns making a stand against the undead attackers.

War of the Green Lanterns
When Krona places Parallax in the Central Power Battery, Turytt is among the many Lanterns brainwashed into serving the mad Guardian. In the aftermath of Krona's defeat, Turytt raises a ruckus in the dining hall, targeting Kyle Rayner, and declaring that human Lanterns have been nothing but trouble for the Corps. Several other Lanterns agree with him, but not Tomar-Tu, who transports Kyle to safety. As things start to turn violent, the Corps is summoned to work by the Guardians. As they depart, Turytt tells Tomar "This isn't over".

See also
The Lost Lanterns
Laira
Kreon
Boodikka
Tomar-Tu
Graf Toren
Ke'Haan
Jack T. Chance
Emerald Twilight

References

Comics characters introduced in 2006
Characters created by Geoff Johns
DC Comics aliens
DC Comics characters with superhuman strength
DC Comics extraterrestrial superheroes
DC Comics superheroes
Green Lantern Corps officers